William Henry Toms (c. 1700–1765) was an English engraver. He worked on portraits, book-plates, landscapes and prints of buildings. Among his works were the plates for Robert West's "Perspective Views of All the Ancient Churches in London" (1736–1739). In 1741, he worked with Thomas Badeslade on "Chorographia Britanniae or a New Set of Maps of all the Counties in England and Wales". The maps were republished on 29 September 1742, with additional place names.

Among Toms's apprentices was the engraver and publisher John Boydell. W. H. Toms lived in Masham Street, London, and was the father of the painter Peter Toms. Toms died in 1765.

References

Citations

Sources

English engravers
1765 deaths